Hajjiabad (also Romanized as Ḩājjīābād and Hājīābād) is a city and capital of Zarrin Dasht County, Fars Province, Iran.  At the 2006 census, its population was 18,346, in 4,195 families.

References

Populated places in Zarrin Dasht County

Cities in Fars Province